The Brazilian burrowing snake (Gomesophis brasiliensis) is a snake endemic to Brazil. It is monotypic in the genus Gomesophis.

References 

Dipsadinae
Reptiles of Brazil
Endemic fauna of Brazil
Reptiles described in 1918